Chris Burgess (born 23 April 1979) is an American former professional basketball player and current assistant coach for the Brigham Young Cougars men's basketball team. Burgess started his freshman year at Mater Dei High School, then transferred to his local school Woodbridge High School in California and played his remaining high school years. He then attended Duke University  and University of Utah. Although Burgess attended training camp with the Phoenix Suns of the NBA, and played on several NBA Summer League teams, he never played in a regular-season NBA game. He did, however, play professional basketball in a variety of leagues in various parts of the world. In 2013, he officially retired from professional basketball and joined the coaching staff at the University of Utah as an undergraduate assistant coach. From 2015 to 2019, Burgess served as  an assistant coach for the Utah Valley University men's basketball team.  Following the 2019 season, Burgess followed UVU head coach Mark Pope to BYU.

College career
Out of high school, Burgess was recruited by several high-profile programs, and he eventually narrowed the choices to Duke and BYU. After consideration, he signed with the Blue Devils. Burgess' decision to attend Duke rather than BYU prompted a controversial series of comments from Cougar head coach Roger Reid, who accused Burgess of letting down his religion by turning down the offer from BYU.  As a member of the Church of Jesus Christ of Latter-day Saints, Burgess was anticipated by many in the community to sign with BYU, which is owned and operated by that faith.  Coach Reid's tirade was the straw that broke the back of his already strained relationship with the university; he was fired by the athletics department in consequence of the remarks and his team's abysmal 1–6 start to the season. (In a twist of fate, Burgess would later work for BYU as an assistant coach)

Burgess played alongside William Avery, Shane Battier, Elton Brand and Corey Maggette at Duke University for two years between 1997 and 1999 (i.e. the 1998 and 1999 seasons) under coach Mike Krzyzewski. Duke made the Elite Eight and the NCAA National Championship game in Burgess's two seasons.  He averaged 4.3 points, 3.4 rebounds, and shot 50.8% from the field while averaging 12.5 minutes a game as a freshman. He averaged 5.4 points, 3.9 rebounds, & shot 61.4% from the field while averaging 15.6 minutes a game as a sophomore. He left Duke as the 23rd all-time leading blocks leader.  His performance fell short of the high expectations heaped on the McDonald's High School All-American when Burgess first chose Duke over BYU.

Eventually, Burgess transferred to the University of Utah under head coach Rick Majerus. At Utah, Burgess suffered three different injuries.  His redshirt year he suffered a bulged disc in his back.  His Junior year, he was forced out of six games due to a broken left ankle.  After a solid start to his senior season, Burgess tore his right plantar fascia on national TV vs. Texas, forcing him to miss the remainder of his senior year. He averaged 7.8 points, 5.9 rebounds, 1.2 blocks, and shot 53.5% from the field while averaging 21.6 minutes a game his junior year. He averaged a team high in 5 statistical categories with 13.2 points, 7.2 rebounds, 1.2 blocks, and shot 66% from the field while averaging 25.5 minutes a game his senior year.

NBA career
2002–2003 – training camp for the Phoenix Suns of the NBA.

2002 – Salt Lake Mountain Revue Summer League with Phoenix Suns

2003 – Boston Summer League with Boston Celtics

2004 – Orlando Summer league & Las Vegas Summer League with Boston Celtics

2006 – Las Vegas Summer League with Washington Wizards

References

External links
Official website
Utah Valley Bio

1979 births
Living people
American expatriate basketball people in Australia
American expatriate basketball people in the Philippines
American expatriate basketball people in Poland
American expatriate basketball people in South Korea
American expatriate basketball people in Turkey
American expatriate basketball people in Ukraine
American expatriate basketball people in the United Arab Emirates
American men's basketball coaches
American men's basketball players
Basketball coaches from California
Basketball players from California
Basket Zielona Góra players
BC Donetsk players
BYU Cougars men's basketball coaches
Centers (basketball)
Duke Blue Devils men's basketball players
Idaho Stampede (CBA) players
Latter Day Saints from California
McDonald's High School All-Americans
Parade High School All-Americans (boys' basketball)
Philippine Basketball Association imports
Power forwards (basketball)
San Miguel Beermen players
Ulsan Hyundai Mobis Phoebus players
Utah Utes men's basketball players
Utah Valley Wolverines men's basketball coaches
Criollos de Caguas basketball players